Oticon is a hearing aid manufacturer based in Copenhagen, Denmark. The company is a subsidiary of the Demant Group. It was founded in 1904 by Hans Demant, whose wife was hearing impaired. The company claims to be the world's second-largest manufacturer of hearing aids, and uses a management style known as "spaghetti organization" introduced by Lars Kolind under his leadership between 1988 and 1998.

Oticon has branches in several countries, including a production plant in Poland, with more than 3,000 employees worldwide.

In 2016, Oticon launched what they claim to be the world's first internet-connected hearing aid, called the Oticon Opn. The company employs an "open sound" approach designed to manage multiple speech and noise sources, even in complex listening situations. The company says the new OpenSound Navigator scans the environment 100 times per second to analyze and balance every sound individually. Environmental sounds are said to be accessible, but not disturbing.

Oticon Medical 
Oticon Medical is a sister company of Oticon, both being subsidiaries of the Demant Group. Whereas Oticon specialises in hearing aids, Oticon Medical specialises in hearing implants and released its first products in 2009. The company's Ponto bone conduction implant is now in its fifth generation. 

In 2013, Oticon Medical acquired Neurelec, a French producer of cochlear implants. Using the acquired technology, the company developed its own Neuro cochlear implant system, which received FDA approval in 2021.

In April 2022, Demant announced it had agreed to sell Oticon Medical to Australian company Cochlear Limited for DKK850 million and would exit the hearing implant business.

References

External links

 Oticon's official website
 Oticon's official UK site for NHS (Oticon NHS), which includes information and training resources for NHS hearing care professionals and the general public

Hearing aid manufacturers
Electronics companies of Denmark
Medical technology companies of Denmark
Manufacturing companies established in 1904
Danish companies established in 1904
Danish brands